Onchoproteocephalidea is an order of flatworms belonging to the class Cestoda.

Families:
 Onchobothriidae
 Prosobothriidae
 Proteocephalidae

References

Cestoda